Ngok Ma is a Hong Kong political scientist.

Education
Ma was educated at the Wah Yan College, Kowloon and graduated from the Chinese University of Hong Kong (CUHK) with bachelor degrees in Journalism and later master in Politics. He obtained a doctoral degree from University of California, Los Angeles.

Academic career
Ma taught at City University of Hong Kong and Hong Kong University of Science and Technology (HKUST). He is now associate professor at CUHK.

Research
Ma specializes in Hong Kong politics and democratization. He argues that as ordinary Hong Kong people place economic prosperity over liberty and freedom, the long-term future of "One Country, Two Systems" is in jeopardy. He also criticizes the Government's move to exempt mainland offices and officials free from legal oversight.

Works

Books

Articles
"The Making of a Corporatist State in Hong Kong: The Road to Sectoral Intervention." Journal of Contemporary China 46.2 (2016): 247–66.
"Migrants and Democratization: The Political Economy of Chinese Immigrants in Hong Kong." Contemporary Chinese Political Economy and Strategic Relations 2.2 (2016): 909–40. (with Stan Hok-Wui Wong and Wai-man Lam)
"The Rise of "Anti-China" Sentiments in Hong Kong and the 2012 Legislative Council Elections." China Review 15.1 (2015): 39–66.
"Value Changes and Legitimacy Crisis in Post-industrial Hong Kong." Asian Survey 51.4 (2011): 683–712.
"Hong Kong’s Democrats Divide." Journal of Democracy 22.1 (2011): 54–67.
"Twenty Years of Functional Elections in Hong Kong: Exclusive Corporatism or Alternative Democratic Form?." Representation 45.4 (2009): 421–33.
"Reinventing the Hong Kong State or Rediscovering It? From Low Interventionism to Eclectic Corporatism." Economy and Society 38.3 (2009): 492–519.
"Civil Society and Democratization in Hong Kong: Paradox and Duality." Taiwan Journal of Democracy 4.2 (2008): 155–75.
"State-Press Relationship in Post-1997 Hong Kong: Constant Negotiation Amidst Self-Restraint." China Quarterly 192 (2007): 949–70.
"Money, Power and Ideas: Think Tank Development and State–Business Relations in Taiwan and Hong Kong." Policy and Politics 34.3 (2006): 535–55. (with Ray Yep)
"Civil Society in Self-Defense: The Struggle against National Security Legislation in Hong Kong." Journal of Contemporary China 14.44 (2005): 465–82.
"Democracy at a Stalemate: The September 2004 Legco Elections in Hong Kong." China Perspectives 57 (2005): 40–9.
"After 1997: The Dialectics of Hong Kong Dependence." Journal of Contemporary Asia 34.2 (2004): 254–70. (with Ian Holliday and Ray Yep)
"SARS and the Limits of the Hong Kong SAR Administrative State." Asian Perspective 28.1 (2004): 99–120.
"The Impact of Electoral Rule Change on Party Campaign Strategy: Hong Kong as a Case Study." Party Politics 9.3 (2003): 347–67. (with Chi-keung Choy)
"A High Degree of Autonomy? Hong Kong Special Administrative Region, 1997–2002." Political Quarterly 73.4 (2002): 455–64. (with Ian Holliday and Ray Yep)
"The Decline of the Democratic Party in Hong Kong: The Second Legislative Election in the HKSAR." Asian Survey 41.4 (2001): 564–83.

References

External links
 Faculty Profile

Living people
Hong Kong political scientists
Year of birth missing (living people)